Solyanka is the name of several rural localities in Russia:
Solyanka, Akhtubinsky District, Astrakhan Oblast, a selo in Pologozaymishchensky Selsoviet of Akhtubinsky District in Astrakhan Oblast; 
Solyanka, Narimanovsky District, Astrakhan Oblast, a selo in Solyansky Selsoviet of Narimanovsky District in Astrakhan Oblast; 
Solyanka, Irkutsk Oblast, a village in Ekhirit-Bulagatsky District of Irkutsk Oblast
Solyanka, Sakha Republic, a selo in Solyansky Rural Okrug of Olyokminsky District in the Sakha Republic
Solyanka, Krasnokutsky District, Saratov Oblast, a selo in Krasnokutsky District of Saratov Oblast
Solyanka, Novouzensky District, Saratov Oblast, a settlement in Novouzensky District of Saratov Oblast
Solyanka, Ozinsky District, Saratov Oblast, a selo in Ozinsky District of Saratov Oblast
Solyanka, Tyumen Oblast, a village in Yurovsky Rural Okrug of Uvatsky District in Tyumen Oblast
Solyanka, Bykovsky District, Volgograd Oblast, a khutor under the administrative jurisdiction of Bykovo Urban-Type Settlement in Bykovsky District of Volgograd Oblast
Solyanka, Svetloyarsky District, Volgograd Oblast, a selo in Chervlenovsky Selsoviet of Svetloyarsky District in Volgograd Oblast